Kim Young-sook (Hangul: 김영숙; born 17 November 1979), better known as Maya (Hangul: 마야) is a South Korean pop rock singer and actress. She debuted in 2003 with the album, Born To Do It, which included the hit single "Azalea."

Discography

Studio albums

Filmography

Television
Bodyguard (KBS2, 2003)
Nursery Story (MBC, 2003)
Magic (SBS, 2004)
Family's Honor (SBS, 2008)
Dandelion Family (MBC, 2010)
Dream of the Emperor (KBS1, 2012)
Ugly Alert (SBS, 2013)

Film
What Is Natural? (2003)

Awards and nominations

State honors

Notes

References

External links

1979 births
Living people
Place of birth missing (living people)
South Korean pop rock singers
South Korean television actresses
South Korean film actresses
MAMA Award winners
21st-century South Korean women singers